Gwangajeong is an old hanok, or Korean traditional house located in Yangdong village, Gangdong-myeon, Gyeongju, South Korea. It was the house of Son Jung-don (孫仲暾 1463-1529), a civil minister during the reign of King Seongjong of the Joseon Dynasty. It is designated as the 442 Treasure of South Korea. Sarangchae (men's quarter) and anchae (women's quarter) of the house are arranged in a rectangular shape looking to the west whereas a shrine is located facing to northeast. The hanok is regarded as a good example for studying houses built in the mid Joseon period.

See also
Soswaewon
Gyeongju Hyanggyo
Oksan Seowon

References

External links

Hanok
Buildings and structures in Gyeongju
Architecture in South Korea
Joseon dynasty